Le Classique (The Classic) is the rivalry between French professional football clubs Paris Saint-Germain and Olympique de Marseille. The duo are the two most successful clubs in French football, and the only French teams to have won major European trophies. Therefore, the fixture is the biggest rivalry in France.

PSG and OM were the dominant teams prior to the emergence of Olympique Lyonnais in the 2000s, and are the most followed French teams internationally. Both clubs are at or near the top of the French attendance lists each season. Their meetings during the 1970s gave little indication the two would become major adversaries. The newly formed Parisians were trying to assemble a competitive team, while the Olympians were Ligue 1 contenders.

The rivalry began in earnest in 1986 when PSG won their first championship and OM was bought by Bernard Tapie. By the end of the decade, PSG was fighting for the 1988–89 title against Tapie's Marseille. The accusations made by PSG president Francis Borelli against Tapie and OM for fixing matches during that season were a contributor to their growing rivalry.

In the 1990s, tensions between the two sides escalated. French TV channel Canal+ bought PSG in 1991 with the aim of breaking Marseille's hegemony but then agreed with Tapie to emphasize the animosity between them as a way to promote the league. With equivalent financial backing, PSG and OM became the main contenders in the title race. Both sides were less successful in the late 1990s and the 2000s but the rivalry remained strong. Since the 2010s, the matchup has been dominated by PSG, and the significant investment of their Qatari owners has created a wide gap between the clubs.

History

Origins

The term "Le Classique" is modelled after El Clásico, contested between Real Madrid and Barcelona. The Spanish press borrowed the term Clásico from South America, where most countries use it to label the biggest rivalries in the continent, such as the Superclásico between Boca Juniors and River Plate, and the Uruguayan Clásico between Nacional and Peñarol. The fixture is also known as "Le Classico", "Le Clasico", "Le Derby de France", "PSG/OM" or "OM/PSG".

Paris Saint-Germain were founded in 1970, and during that decade they were not at the same level as Olympique de Marseille, traditionally a giant of the French game. Formed in 1899, Marseille have been competing for trophies for most of their history and, for the first 87 years at least, were more concerned about games against Saint-Étienne or Girondins de Bordeaux than trips to the capital. Today, the clash is considered France's biggest rivalry as well as one of the greatest in club football. The duo are French football's most successful clubs as well as the only two French sides to lift a major European trophy. They were also the undisputed top teams before the irruption of Olympique Lyonnais at the start of the 2000s. Nevertheless, they still are the two most popular French clubs in the country and abroad, ahead of Lyon. Both teams usually top the attendance lists every campaign as well.

Like all major rivalries, it has a historical, cultural and social importance that makes it more than just a football match. People in France see it as a battle between the two largest cities in France: Paris against Marseille, capital against province, north against south, the hub of political power against the working class and the aristocracy's club against the people's club. Ironically, though, PSG were born as a fan-owned team, while OM were founded by a circle of aristocratic gentlemen. In short, the seeds of the fiercest French rivalry yet were always there but they only began to grow from 1986 onwards. That year, PSG clinched their maiden championship and French businessman Bernard Tapie bought Marseille. Tapie proceeded to invest huge amounts of money in star signings such as Chris Waddle, Abedi Pelé, Jean-Pierre Papin, Basile Boli, Enzo Francescoli, Eric Cantona, Didier Deschamps and Marcel Desailly.

The clash increased in importance and ferocity when they went head to head for the 1988–89 title, during which PSG president Francis Borelli accused Tapie and OM of fixing matches. Between 1989 and 1992, the southerners won four successive Ligue 1 championships. They also finished runners-up in the 1990–91 European Cup before claiming the 1992–93 UEFA Champions League. Marseille fans have never let their PSG counterparts forget this triumph with the slogan "A jamais les premiers" (Forever First). All these successes, however, were also tainted by match-fixing allegations from title rivals PSG and Monaco as well as other clubs, adding further fuel to the rivalry.

Golden era and scandal

Despite proving to be tough competitors, PSG were still no match for Marseille. This was the case until 1991 and the arrival of new owners Canal+, the biggest pay television station in France. The main reason behind the buyout was to revive interest in a Ligue 1 completely dominated by Marseille as well as lure more subscribers by assembling a team that could beat them. With Bordeaux a fading force, Bernard Tapie needed a new domestic rival to make the championship attractive again. Tapie encouraged Canal+ to help him promote the enmity between the two clubs to a confrontational level, and the rivalry was born. Backed by their own rich owner, PSG began to flex muscles in the transfer market with Tapie's Marseille, recruiting top talent like David Ginola, Youri Djorkaeff, George Weah and Raí. The league was now a two-horse race and they battled each other for the title in the early 1990s.

Between 1989 and 1998, PSG and OM picked up five league titles, four Coupe de France, two Coupe de la Ligue, a UEFA Champions League, a UEFA Cup Winners' Cup and reached two other European finals. Many experts argue that those Marseille (1989–1994) and PSG (1993–1998) sides were two of the greatest teams in the history of French football. The hype heightened tensions between supporters as well, and reports of fan violence became more frequent in the 1990s. Since then, the matchup has been marred with injuries and arrests.

The rivalry reached new heights during the 1992–93 French Division 1 campaign. PSG lost the title decider against OM and finished second. Shortly after, however, Tapie and Marseille were found guilty of match-fixing, in what became known as the French football bribery scandal. The French Football Federation stripped OM of their title and offered it to runners-up PSG, who refused it because club owners Canal+ thought that claiming the trophy would anger their subscribers back in Marseille. As a result, the 1992–93 title remains unattributed. Canal+ even refused letting PSG participate in next year's Champions League after UEFA excluded Marseille from the competition. Third-placed Monaco took the spot instead.

OM were then forcibly relegated to Ligue 2 in 1994 for lacking the necessary funds to continue among the elite. With Marseille out of the picture, PSG would go on to claim nine trophies during that decade. Most notably, they won their second league title in 1994 and their crowning glory, the 1995–96 UEFA Cup Winners' Cup, becoming only the second French team to win a major European title (after OM), and the last one to date.

Marseille and their fans have since accused the Parisian political elite of plotting against them to crown PSG as the kings of French football. This feeling of injustice stems from the political dimension to the rivalry, which has been described by FIFA as pitting "the chosen ones of French football (the politically-favored PSG) against their enfants terribles (the unruly OM)." PSG have been indeed favored a few times. Club president Daniel Hechter was found guilty of running a ticketing scheme in 1977 and his replacement, Francis Borelli, incurred serious debts and financial irregularities in 1991. Unlike their arch-rivals, PSG were not relegated in either case; instead, they were bought by Canal+ with the specific goal of dethroning OM. Two decades later, French president Nicolas Sarkozy, a well-known supporter of PSG, which was then struggling financially, facilitated the club's purchase by Qatar Sports Investments.

Rivalry today

Marseille quickly bounced back into the top flight in 1996 after two seasons in Ligue 2 but their new owner was not so keen to spend like Bernard Tapie. Likewise, PSG owners Canal+ slowly began to reduce their investment in the transfer market. Nonetheless, the rivalry remained just as intense. OM only lost twice to their northern rivals between September 1990 and February 2000, before Paris became the dominant force in the 2000s, during which they produced a spectacular run of eight consecutive wins between 2002 and 2004.

In spite of both laying claim to being France's biggest club, PSG and OM have rarely been at their best at the same time and, thus, have competed directly for titles only a few times. They first met in a cup final in the 2006 Coupe de France Final where Paris defeated Marseille 2–1 to clinch the title. The duo have also never been drawn together in UEFA competitions. The closest they were of facing one another in Europe was in the 2008–09 edition of the UEFA Cup but were eliminated in the quarter-finals by Ukrainian teams Dynamo Kyiv and Shakhtar Donetsk, thus preventing a semi-final matchup between them.

The balance briefly shifted again in favor of Marseille during the late 2000s and early 2010s, with the Olympians claiming the Ligue 1 and French League Cup double in 2010, ending their 17-year trophy drought, and then downing Paris in the 2010 Trophée des Champions on penalties. Since the arrival of Qatar Sports Investments as PSG owners in 2011, though, the matchup has turned into a one-sided affair. Now with the money to compete with the best clubs in Europe, many great players have been part of PSG's all star-lineup that Ligue 1 had not seen since the early 1990s Marseille squads, including Neymar, Kylian Mbappé, Thiago Silva, Zlatan Ibrahimović, Edinson Cavani, Ángel Di María and Lionel Messi. Paris have monopolized French football, becoming the country's most successful club in history in terms of titles won.

In turn, OM have struggled to keep up. Trophy-less since the 2012 French League Cup, they have occasionally threatened PSG's hegemony. Marseille went head-to-head against eventual champions Paris for the league crown in 2013 as both sides finished in the two top spots for the first time since the 1994 title race, which PSG also won. They had previously competed for the championship in 1989 and 1993, with OM overcoming second-placed Paris both times. PSG were also crowned champions ahead of Marseille in 2020 and 2022. Further, they clashed in the 2016 Coupe de France Final and the 2020 Trophée des Champions, with PSG clinching both titles.

The Parisians have won 22 out of the 29 matches played since their takeover. On the other hand, the Olympians have defeated their arch-rivals just three times. In September 2020, Marseille's second win in nearly nine years sparked a new fire into the rivalry. OM midfielder Dimitri Payet mocked PSG's 2020 UEFA Champions League final defeat to Bayern Munich ahead of kickoff, leading to a massive brawl with PSG superstar Neymar and Marseille defender Álvaro as protagonists.

Notable games

First blood for Marseille, biggest win for PSG

12 December 1971 (OM 4–2 PSG). The inaugural clash took place at the Stade Vélodrome, just a little over a year after PSG were formed. The Parisians were trying to avoid the drop in their top-flight debut season, while the Olympians were aiming for their second consecutive title. Logically, the match ended in a comprehensive win for a Marseille side inspired by Yugoslavian striker Josip Skoblar, who scored 100 goals in his first 100 appearances at OM, including a brace in this match. Bernard Bosquier and Didier Couécou also got on the scoresheet, with the former netting the first-ever Le Classique goal. Michel Prost scored PSG's two goals.

9 May 1975 (OM 2–2 PSG). Played amidst a hostile atmosphere, PSG visited the Stade Vélodrome as massive underdogs in the quarter-finals of the 1974–75 Coupe de France. OM were comfortably leading 2–0 until, out of the blue, François M'Pelé scored twice to revive PSG's hopes of qualification. Angered by the result, Marseille fans were behind the fixture's first violent incidents after the final whistle. History says the rivalry began in the 1990s but M'Pelé believes this cup game is the true origin of the animosity between both clubs.

13 May 1975 (PSG 2–0 OM). In the second leg, PSG registered their first win ever against the southerners and qualified for the semi-finals of the Coupe de France with goals from Louis Floch and Jacques Laposte. At the end of the match, Marseille's Brazilian stars Caju and Jairzinho lost their nerves and physically assaulted the referee on their way to the locker room. They were suspended and never played for the Olympians again.

8 January 1978 (PSG 5–1 OM). Over two years later, Paris recorded their first league triumph against Marseille. It was also PSG's largest victory over their rivals as well as one of the fixture's largest wins. The Parisian players dedicated it to Daniel Hechter, who had just been removed from office due to a corruption scandal and was attending his last match as club president. Team captain Mustapha Dahleb climbed into the stands of the Parc des Princes and offered him the match ball. OM scored first through Boubacar Sarr but PSG responded with a François M'Pelé brace, strikes from François Brisson and Dahleb, and an own goal from Marseille's Marius Trésor. The result could have been even worse for the visitors as Carlos Bianchi missed a penalty and PSG hit the woodwork three times.

7 April 1979 (PSG 4–3 OM). PSG won a spectacular goal-fest over Marseille thanks to Carlos Bianchi's late screamer. Bernard Bureau, Mustapha Dahleb and Armando Bianchi also scored for Paris, while Marc Berdoll (twice) and Robert Buigues were on target for OM. This game holds the record for most goals in a Clasico.

8 December 1979 (OM 0–2 PSG). Paris had to wait eight years to finally claim their first away win in the matchup. Goals from former Marseille striker Boubacar Sarr, who became the first player to score for both clubs, and Jean-François Beltramini gave PSG the three points at the Stade Vélodrome in a season which saw OM relegated to the second tier.

Marseille supremacy and Sauzée's title-winning goal

28 November 1986 (OM 4–0 PSG). Recently bought by Bernard Tapie, the southern club immediately recorded its largest win over PSG, with future French legend Jean-Pierre Papin scoring the last goal against the defending league champions at the Stade Vélodrome. This match is also remembered because PSG defender Philippe Jeannol had to replace injured keeper Joël Bats at halftime. Back then, clubs could only have two substitutes on the bench, so Jeannol was PSG's goalie during the second half, conceding Marseille's last two goals.

21 May 1988 (OM 1–2 PSG). Safet Sušić's opener and a late goal from Gabriel Calderón gave Paris their second ever win away to OM. This result proved to be vital in keeping PSG's Ligue 1 status at the end of the 1987–88 season and dashed Marseille's hopes of European qualification. At the final whistle, Bernard Tapie threatened the referee, claiming he would not ensure his safety when leaving the stadium. The match is best remembered for a play involving PSG defender Michel Bibard and OM striker Jean-Pierre Papin. The latter broke in alone and headed for the goal when Bibard imitated the referee's whistle. Unaware of the deception, Papin stopped his course and gave the ball to the keeper. But Papin soon realised what had really happened and a heated argument between both players ensued, almost ending in a general brawl.

5 May 1989 (OM 1–0 PSG). The 1988–89 title decider at the Vélodrome was the match that set the tone for the years that followed. Before the game, PSG president Francis Borelli accused his Marseille counterpart Bernard Tapie of fixing matches. Played out amid an electric atmosphere, the title looked to be heading to league leaders Paris with the score tied at 0–0 and only a few seconds remaining. But a 25-yard shot from Franck Sauzée surprised PSG goalkeeper Joël Bats as OM leapfrogged their rivals at the top of the table to seal a first trophy in 17 years.

Birth of Ligue 1's greatest rivalry

18 December 1992 (PSG 0–1 OM). The duo finally became sworn enemies after this particularly brutal match at the Parc des Princes, which earned itself the nickname the "Butchery of 1992." It was on this day that the French Clasico was born. PSG coach Artur Jorge announced his side would crush their arch-rivals, while Parisian player David Ginola promised war upon OM. Bernard Tapie seized the opportunity to motivate his players and stuck the newspaper articles with PSG's provocations in the dressing room. Marseille would not disappoint him, walking away with the victory thanks to a strike from Alen Bokšić in what was an extremely violent match with more than 50 fouls. There were also several aggressions, most notably OM defender Éric Di Meco punching PSG's Patrick Colleter in the face.

29 May 1993 (OM 3–1 PSG). Only three days after winning the 1992–93 UEFA Champions League, league leaders Marseille welcomed closest challengers PSG in a match that would determine the title. OM quickly fell behind, only to hit back with three goals, including one of the fixture's best goals: a team effort finished by an 18-yard header from Basile Boli. Soon after, however, Marseille were stripped of the 1993 championship due to match-fixing, and were subsequently demoted to Ligue 2 in 1994.

8 November 1997 (PSG 1–2 OM). Despite their fall from grace, OM only lost twice to PSG in the 1990s as the rivalry became more and more heated. Recently back to Ligue 1, the Olympians claimed one of the matchup's most infamous wins. With the scored tied, PSG's Éric Rabésandratana apparently tripped Marseille's Fabrizio Ravanelli inside the area. Laurent Blanc converted the highly controversial penalty to give OM the victory in Paris. To this day, PSG fans accuse Ravanelli of a clear act of simulation.

4 May 1999 (PSG 2–1 OM). Leaders Marseille went ahead through ex-PSG man Florian Maurice but late goals from Marco Simone and Bruno Rodriguez gave their title hopes a huge blow. After netting the equalizer, Simone mocked Marseille fans by showing off his Batman tattoo. It was PSG's first league win over Marseille in nine years (April 1990). OM were now behind Bordeaux, who played PSG in the final matchday. Amid a Parc des Princes demanding their team to lose, Bordeaux won with a late goal and were crowned champions, much to the joy of PSG fans. To this day, Marseille supporters believe Paris let Bordeaux win.

15 February 2000 (OM 4–1 PSG). A mid-table Marseille side thumped podium hopefuls Paris at the Stade Vélodrome in a heated match. The referee showed two straight red cards to former PSG teammates Laurent Leroy and Jérôme Leroy, now at OM. Laurent reacted to a tough tackle from Jérôme by kicking him. They continued to trade blows as it soon escalated into a general brawl. Both of them were then sent off. Florian Maurice, who scored Marseille's last goal, famously celebrated it by taking off his right shoe and throwing it to the supporters.

Ronaldinho, Pauleta and PSG's eight consecutive wins

10 February 2002 (PSG 1–1 OM). The duo met in the Coupe de France for the first time since 1995. Daniel Van Buyten had given OM the advantage midway through the second half and were about to send PSG packing when Gabriel Heinze snatched the equaliser five minutes from time. Still level after extra time, Parisian goalkeeper Jérôme Alonzo was the hero in the penalty shootout, stopping three of Marseille's nine shots to reach the quarter-finals.

26 October 2002 (PSG 3–0 OM). Ronaldinho stole the show that night, guiding his team with dribbles, sprints, no-look passes and goals to a crushing victory over their arch-rivals at the Parc des Princes. He opened the scoring with a spectacular free kick. Taken from the left side of the penalty area, Ronaldinho slotted the ball into the bottom right corner. The Brazilian completed his brace by transforming a penalty before Martín Cardetti added the third with a header. On the sidelines, PSG coach Luis Fernández famously celebrated Ronnie's first goal by performing an improvised samba dance. This match launched a series of eight consecutive wins against Marseille.

9 March 2003 (OM 0–3 PSG). Ronaldinho was back at it again during PSG's visit to Marseille. The Brazilian playmaker scored one goal and assisted another as his team snatched their first win at the Stade Vélodrome in 14 years (May 1988). Jérôme Leroy broke the deadlock in the first half, scoring a 25-yard rocket from a near-impossible angle. After the interval, Ronaldinho intercepted a poor pass from Marseille's Franck Leboeuf to break away on his own before flicking the ball over outgoing goalkeeper Vedran Runje to score. He followed up with another fantastic run near the end of the match. Starting from his own half, Ronnie held off Brahim Hemdani, rounded Runje in the box and then feinted to shoot, deceiving Hemdani, before calmly assisting Leroy.

30 November 2003 (OM 0–1 PSG). Against a better home side, Fabrice Fiorèse finished a 90th-minute counter-attack to give PSG a second consecutive win at the Stade Vélodrome for the first time ever. He famously celebrated the goal by cupping his ears and taunting the Marseille fans. Nine months later, Fiorèse signed for OM, claiming it was 'a dream come true.'

25 April 2004 (PSG 2–1 OM). In a match largely dominated by the home side, Pauleta's star performance was the highlight of the evening. The Portuguese striker scored twice and his first of the game is one of the rivalry's finest goals: a precise lob from an impossible angle to trump Marseille goalkeeper Fabien Barthez.

7 November 2004 (PSG 2–1 OM). The return of Frédéric Déhu and Fabrice Fiorèse to Paris took the spotlight off the match. Both players had left the French capital to join Marseille in the summer of 2004, and they received an exceptionally hostile welcome from PSG supporters. After only twenty minutes of play, PSG defender Sylvain Armand was sent off for a violent tackle on Fiorèse. The former Parisian was also the target of multiple projectiles raining down from the stands. The CRS riot police had to shield Fiorèse every time he would take a corner. Despite being one man down for most of the game, PSG still managed to win thanks to a pair of magnificent goals from Pauleta and Édouard Cissé.

10 November 2004 (OM 2–3 PSG). Three days later, the two sides met again for the second round of the 2004–05 Coupe de la Ligue. PSG coach Vahid Halilhodžić chose to rest the usual starters and Marseille quickly put themselves two goals in front. It seemed their luck was finally about to change but PSG's youngsters and substitutes had other plans. Branko Bošković scored twice to draw level before Bernard Mendy intercepted a back-pass from Bixente Lizarazu to keeper Fabien Barthez, dribbling past the latter and slotting the ball into the empty net to complete a stunning last-minute comeback. This was PSG's eighth and final consecutive victory against OM, a run known by Parisian fans as "Le Grand Huit" ("The Great Eight").

PSG triumph in Le Classique French Cup final

16 October 2005 (OM 1–0 PSG). Former PSG fan favorite Lorik Cana, who had signed for Marseille directly from the capital side a few months earlier, scored the only goal of the game. It was Marseille's first win since April 2002, putting an end to PSG's nine-match unbeaten run in the fixture. Two hours before kickoff, a smell of ammonia floated in the Parisian locker room, with TV footage showing coach Laurent Fournier and his players coughing as they exited it. According to PSG players Modeste M'bami and Fabrice Pancrate, their rivals employed further destabilisation tactics. First, they were moved to a new locker room placed under the local supporters and, then, former Marseille-born porn star and OM supporter, Clara Morgane, passed by while they were changing. They claim that she was instructed by the Olympian club to do so. Although Morgane did attend the game, she denied the allegations. Fournier complained that his team's preparations were disrupted by these incidents. To which Marseille president Pape Diouf responded that they needed "to learn to accept defeat."

5 March 2006 (PSG 0–0 OM). The growing tensions between supporters resulted in less seats for the visiting fans. In protest, Marseille president Pape Diouf sent the club's reserve players in a match known by OM fans as the Classico of "Les Minots" ("The Kids"). The fourth division side managed a goalless draw and were welcomed as champions in the south.

29 April 2006 (OM 1–2 PSG). Both teams met in the 2006 Coupe de France Final at the Stade de France. Marseille had the opportunity to win their first trophy since 1993 but league strugglers Paris denied them the title. Bonaventure Kalou scored early on and Vikash Dhorasoo then doubled PSG's advantage with an amazing 25-yard shot. Toifilou Maoulida pulled one back but OM could not find an equalizer and Paris were crowned champions.

26 October 2008 (OM 2–4 PSG). Driven by a brace from Guillaume Hoarau and a great second-half performance, the Parisians scored four goals at the Stade Vélodrome for the first time ever. This win set them on the course for the league title and prevented Marseille from taking the lead at the top of the table.

15 March 2009 (PSG 1–3 OM). Following the surprise defeat of league leaders Olympique Lyonnais, a win would give Paris the top spot. With the score tied at 1–1 in the second half, Zoumana Camara's straight red card in the 53rd minute was the turning point. Over the next eight minutes Marseille scored twice through Bakari Koné and Lorik Cana, killing PSG's title hopes and leapfrogging them into second place. Marseille finished runners-up to Bordeaux that season, while Paris ended in sixth place. Boudewijn Zenden, who scored the equaliser for OM, is best remembered for his failed goal celebration that night. He climbed onto an Orange TV advertising billboard looking at the Marseille supporters but, when Brandão tried to join him, it could not bear the weight and sank with Zenden falling inside and disappearing from the cameras.

H1N1 pandemic and Marseille's super cup victory over PSG

20 November 2009 (OM 1–0 PSG). Ten years before the COVID-19 pandemic, the 2009 swine flu pandemic landed in France. Originally scheduled to be played in October, this mach was postponed after PSG players Ludovic Giuly, Mamadou Sakho and Jérémy Clément were diagnosed with H1N1 flu and the whole squad was quarantined at their hotel in Marseille. It finally took place in November when former idol Gabriel Heinze crucified Paris with the game's only goal, becoming the second player to score for both sides after Boubacar Sarr in 1979.

28 February 2010 (PSG 0–3 OM). Goals from Hatem Ben Arfa, Lucho González and Benoît Cheyrou handed the Olympians their biggest win ever at the Parc des Princes against a mediocre Parisian side that finished in 13th place. Marseille would go on to win the Ligue 1 title as well as the French League Cup, ending their 17-year trophy drought.
28 July 2010 (OM 0–0 PSG). Marseille won their first Trophée des Champions in 2010, beating PSG 5–4 on penalties after a goalless draw in Tunis. The two arch-rivals failed to offer much in the way of a spectacle for their first encounter in this competition. Both Peguy Luyindula and Ludovic Giuly missed from the spot for the Parisians and although Lucho González also failed to find the net for OM, former PSG midfielder Édouard Cissé stuck the winning kick.
7 November 2010 (PSG 2–1 OM). Nenê was in stellar form as Paris claimed their first home victory over OM in six years (November 2004). Mevlüt Erdinç opened the scoring by tapping home a rebound after Marseille goalkeeper Steve Mandanda failed to hold on to an angled shot from Nenê. The Turkish striker then delighted the home fans with his memorable goal celebration. He lifted his shirt to reveal a t-shirt carrying club motto 'Paris est magique!' ('Paris is magical!'). Guillaume Hoarau doubled PSG's lead shortly after with a shot between Mandanda's legs after Nenê found him with a magnificent lob over the Olympian defenders. Lucho González rapidly pulled one back but OM could not find the equaliser against a determined PSG defence.

27 November 2011 (OM 3–0 PSG). PSG had just been bought by Qatar Sports Investments and the first big-money Parisian stars walked into the Stade Vélodrome for the inaugural Derby de France of the Qatari era. The capital club arrived as league leaders but returned home having lost the lead and being outclassed by a largely superior OM side thanks to goals from Loïc Rémy, Morgan Amalfitano and André Ayew. This was Marseille's last victory over Paris until September 2020.

Zlatan's Parisian hegemony: ten back-to-back wins

7 October 2012 (OM 2–2 PSG). André-Pierre Gignac opened the scoring but PSG's Zlatan Ibrahimović turned things around with a volleyed back-heel and a 25-yard free-kick. Gignac ensured parity with his second of the night as OM remained top of the table. This was the first time since January 1994 that both teams went into the game occupying the top two spots.

24 February 2013 (PSG 2–0 OM). In the return match, Paris came out on top in a tight title decider at the Parc des Princes. Despite an early own goal from Nicolas N'Koulou, the Olympians dominated and had the best chances throughout. PSG goalkeeper Salvatore Sirigu made several superb saves to preserve his team's advantage and Zlatan Ibrahimović secured the win over their 2012–13 Ligue 1 title rivals in added time.

6 October 2013 (OM 1–2 PSG). Thiago Motta was shown red after bringing down Mathieu Valbuena inside the box and André Ayew converted the ensuing the penalty. But despite the man handicap, PSG rallied with goals from Maxwell and Zlatan Ibrahimović beating Marseille in their own back yard for the first time since October 2008.

5 April 2015 (OM 2–3 PSG). Leaders Paris visited second-place OM for the title decider two points. André-Pierre Gignac scored twice in between Blaise Matuidi's stunning curled shot but Marquinhos' fortunate strike and Jérémy Morel's own goal saw PSG march on towards the title.

21 May 2016 (OM 2–4 PSG). Both sides met in the 2016 French Cup final at the Stade de France. Paris were aiming for a second successive domestic treble, while OM were trying to salvage a mediocre season. Playing his last game for the club, Zlatan Ibrahimović scored twice and assisted another as PSG took home the trophy in front of a record 80,000 spectators. This was PSG's tenth and final victory in a row.

26 February 2017 (OM 1–5 PSG). Goals from Marquinhos, Edinson Cavani, Lucas Moura, Julian Draxler and Blaise Matuidi gave Paris their largest away victory yet. Marseille were already trailing by two goals after 16 minutes and could have been handed a heavier loss.

22 October 2017 (OM 2–2 PSG). Luiz Gustavo opened the scoring for Marseille with a 30-yard shot before Neymar equalised. Late in the game, OM regained the lead through Florian Thauvin and Neymar was sent off. The Olympians were seconds away from their first win since November 2011 but Edinson Cavani's last-gasp free-kick silenced the whole stadium.

28 October 2018 (OM 0–2 PSG). Left on the bench by PSG coach Thomas Tuchel for being late to a meeting, second-half super-sub Kylian Mbappé swiftly broke the deadlock with a great solo run three minutes after coming on. Late drama followed as OM were denied a goal because of Marquinhos' theatrics before Julian Draxler netted PSG's second in stoppage time. The German winger celebrated by cupping his ears to the Marseille supporters.

27 October 2019 (PSG 4–0 OM). A banner in the Auteuil curve of the Parc des Princes, reading "We have been hammering you for eight years and it's not over," set the tone for the game. Mauro Icardi and Kylian Mbappé scored twice each in the first half as PSG trumped Marseille with a scoreline on par with the matchup's biggest wins. This was PSG's twentieth and final unbeaten match against OM, a run which saw the Parisians win seventeen times, including ten victories in a row, and draw the remaining three games.

COVID-19 pandemic and "Battle of Paris"

22 March 2020 (match cancelled). In the rivalry's history, this is the only game to have ever been cancelled. On April 30, 2020, the Ligue de Football Professionnel awarded the 2019–20 Ligue 1 title to Paris Saint-Germain after the French Government cancelled the sporting season in the country because of the COVID-19 pandemic in France. As a result, the second league match between Marseille and PSG, scheduled to be held on March 22, 2020, at the Stade Vélodrome, was never played.

13 September 2020 (PSG 0–1 OM). Shortly after PSG's 2020 UEFA Champions League final defeat to Bayern Munich, Marseille's Dimitri Payet used social media to remind the Parisians that his side remains the only French team ever to have won the trophy, preparing the ground for a violent match at the Parc des Princes. The game was dubbed the "Battle of Paris" by media outlets. Florian Thauvin scored the only goal of the match in the first half, volleying Payet's free-kick in from close range. It was Marseille's first victory over their arch-rivals since November 2011. In injury time, a full-scale brawl broke out on the pitch. PSG's Neymar, Leandro Paredes and Layvin Kurzawa were sent off, as were Darío Benedetto and Jordan Amavi of OM. Neymar, as he left the field, accused Álvaro of making a racist remark towards him. The Brazilian claimed the Olympian defender called him a "monkey son of a bitch." Álvaro quickly denied the allegations. Subsequently, Neymar himself was accused of making a homophobic comment towards Álvaro, supposedly calling him a "fucking faggot," as well as racially abusing Marseille's Japanese right back Hiroki Sakai, whom he allegedly called a "Chinese shit." Álvaro and Neymar were facing bans of up to 10 and 20 games, respectively, but in the end the French League took no further action citing insufficient evidence. Soon after, Sakai also cleared the PSG star of any wrongdoing against him. Post-match, PSG winger Ángel Di María was given a four-game ban for spitting towards Álvaro.

13 January 2021 (PSG 2–1 OM). Paris had their revenge in the 2020 Trophée des Champions. Mauro Icardi put a dominant PSG side ahead six minutes before the break, tapping home the opener after Marseille goalkeeper Steve Mandanda had pushed onto the post his initial header. The second half saw Neymar's first appearance since his ankle injury in December 2020. He was immediately targeted by Álvaro, who fouled him several times in a continuation of the pair's quarrel in the previous match. It was Neymar who had the last laugh, though. When Icardi was brought down by Mandanda, the Brazilian forward converted the winning goal from the penalty spot. Dimitri Payet pulled one back for OM with a minute remaining but PSG hung on to clinch the title. Post-match, Neymar mocked Álvaro, as well as Payet, on social media. PSG also took to Twitter to make fun of Payet and his empty trophy cabinet.

8 February 2023 (OM 2–1 PSG). The Olympians reached the Coupe de France quarterfinals thanks to an Alexis Sánchez penalty and a Ruslan Malinovskyi thunderbolt after a late first-half equalizer from PSG's Sergio Ramos. It was Marseille's first French Cup victory over the Parisians since April 1991, almost 32 years after they ran away 0–2 winners at the Parc des Princes; their maiden triumph against their rivals at the Stade Vélodrome in a domestic cup match; and their first home win overall in Le Classique since November 2011.

Supporters

Violent incidents

9 May 1975: Feeling their side were robbed of a penalty late in the game, Marseille supporters attacked the PSG team bus after the final whistle and clashed with the CRS riot police.

29 May 1993: Both sets of fans clashed at the Stade Vélodrome leaving fourteen people injured. Marseille fans retaliated after being thrown a dozen flares by visiting PSG supporters, who also set several OM shirts on fire during the game.

11 April 1995: 146 people were arrested and nine policemen were hospitalised after clashes between fans from the two teams.

8 November 1997: Three people were treated for minor injuries but no arrests were made.

4 May 1999: Both sets of supporters launched the game by fighting on the lawn of the Parc des Princes before kick-off.

13 October 2000: 18-year-old Marseille supporter, Geoffrey Dilly, was left paralysed for life after being struck by a seat thrown from the PSG fan section located above.

26 October 2002: PSG hooligans and the police clashed outside the Parc des Princes, resulting in 61 arrests, 35 people treated for minor injuries and eight hospitalisations.

25 January 2003: 38 people were arrested but no one was injured.

9 March 2003: 27 people suffered minor injuries, while one had to be hospitalised.

7 November 2004: PSG fans stoned the Marseille team bus when arriving to the Parc des Princes and OM coach José Anigo suffered minor injuries.

29 April 2006: Rival factions of PSG supporters, armed with batons and pieces of wood, clashed around the Stade de France during the 2006 Coupe de France Final.

4 February 2007: Marseille fans stoned the PSG team bus upon its arrival to the Stade Vélodrome. Buses of Parisian supporters were also targeted when they arrived at the stadium.

15 March 2009: PSG supporters launched more than 60 flares during the match, including four rockets towards the away stand, causing burns to the neck of a Marseille fan.

26 October 2009: In the midst of the 2009 swine flu pandemic, three PSG players were diagnosed with H1N1 flu and the match was postponed only hours before it was scheduled to start. 2,000 Parisian fans were already in Marseille and clashes erupted between both sides. Ten Marseille fans were arrested by the CRS riot police and ten people were injured, including one PSG supporter who was hit by a car that fled the scene. The game was played on 20 November 2009.

5 April 2015: Marseille fans pelted the PSG team bus with stones and other objects before kickoff as the Parisians made their way to the Stade Vélodrome. Reports said PSG star Zlatan Ibrahimović was almost hit by a golf ball that smashed through the window of team coach Laurent Blanc. The police also clashed with OM supporters blocking a roundabout near the stadium and used tear gas to disperse them. Eight officers sustained minor injuries, while eight Marseille fans were arrested.

21 May 2016: Before the 2016 Coupe de France Final at the Stade de France, there were scuffles between PSG and OM hooligans. With Paris claiming a 4–2 victory on the final whistle, angry Marseille supporters lit two flares in the stands and torched a few seats. 30 people were arrested but there were no reports of injuries.

28 February 2018: After being allowed to travel to the Parc des Princes for the first time since 2014, Marseille fans ripped out no less than 137 seats from the visitors' grandstand and some of them were even swung towards the side stand. They also degraded the stadium toilets.

18 August 2020: Fans of the two sides clashed in Marseille following PSG's UEFA Champions League semi-final win over RB Leipzig. One man was arrested for attacking a man wearing a PSG shirt. Hundreds of OM fans sang anti-PSG songs and detonated firecrackers. In response, the local police banned the use of PSG shirts around the city on the night of their 2020 UEFA Champions League final defeat to Bayern Munich. They later backtracked on the order.

Tifo choreographies

Statistics
.

Honours

Finals

Overall record

Head-to-head ranking in Ligue 1

• Total: Marseille with 22 higher finishes, Paris Saint-Germain with 21 higher finishes (out of 43 seasons with both clubs in Ligue 1).

Records
.

Club

Biggest wins

Winning margin by 4 goals or more.

Most goals in a match

Six goals or more.

Longest runs

Winning

Five consecutive matches won or more.

Unbeaten

Five consecutive matches unbeaten or more.

Highest attendances

All-time highest attendances (PSG home, OM home and Neutral venue).

Individual

Most appearances

Top scorers

Hat-tricks

No player has ever scored a hat-trick in Le Classique.

Playing for both clubs

Despite all of the bad blood, as many as 49 players have played for both clubs. Some of them have even made the round trip several times, including Jérôme Leroy, Xavier Gravelaine, Boubacar Sarr and Bruno Germain. When OM and PSG became Ligue 1's best of enemies in the early 1990s, transfers began to make headlines. Talented French youngster Jocelyn Angloma was the rivalry's first notorious deal between the two sides; he left Paris for Marseille in 1990. Managers have also crossed the divide, albeit without any of the drama. Only two coaches have been at the helm of both clubs: Lucien Leduc and Tomislav Ivić.

PSG made the next big move with the signings of French football prodigies Peter Luccin and Stéphane Dalmat from OM in 2000. After a convincing season in the south, the midfield duo responded positively to the sirens of the capital to compete in the 2000–01 UEFA Champions League. Marseille hit back with adored PSG captain Frédéric Déhu who, following a confrontation with manager Vahid Halilhodžić, decided to sign for OM when his contract expired in 2004. When his deal was revealed days before the 2004 French Cup Final, the match became a nightmare for Déhu, who was constantly booed by PSG fans. After lifting the trophy, he disappeared into the dressing room in tears and refused to perform a lap of honor with his teammates.

That same summer, minutes before the end of the transfer window, fan favorite Fabrice Fiorèse joined Déhu at Marseille. Citing a conflict with Halilhodžić as the main reason for him leaving, Fiorèse also said that OM had always been the club of his dreams. Upon their return to the Parc des Princes, Déhu and Fiorèse were whistled and jeered by PSG supporters, who also displayed dozens of insulting banners, including one from the Kop of Boulogne aimed at Fiorèse that read "We have Jesus (along with a portrait of PSG defender Mario Yepes), you have Judas."

In similar fashion, beloved PSG Academy graduate Lorik Cana signed for Marseille in 2005 after losing his starting place under manager Laurent Fournier. Like Fiorèse before him, Cana declared that he was joining 'the club of my heart' in his official presentation. PSG fans welcomed him back with a flood of insults in 2006. Later that year, Modeste M'bami also signed with OM despite previously saying he would never play for them. In the next Classico in Paris, one banner read "Déhu, Fiorèse, Cana, M'bami, the list of whores keeps growing." PSG consoled themselves with Peguy Luyindula, who signed from Marseille in 2007 claiming to have fulfilled a lifelong ambition. Luyindula was the last direct transfer between the two sides to date. As part of the deal, it was agreed he would not make his debut in the following match against OM.

But Marseille had the last laugh so far. Idolized by fans during his stint in the capital, Argentine defender Gabriel Heinze told reporters in 2005 that he loved PSG and would only play for them if he ever went back to France. Four years later, however, with his return for the 2009–10 season almost a done deal, Heinze decided instead to sign for OM at the last minute. The Parisian fans welcomed him back to the Parc des Princes with insults, whistles and hostile banners, only for him to net Marseille's winning goal, becoming the second player, after Boubacar Sarr, to have scored for both clubs in the clash. Sarr, however, remains the only one to score for both teams as well as being transferred directly between them. The 'transfer war' has cooled down since then as Qatar-backed PSG have had the financial muscle to recruit any player in the world, while OM have had to settle for more modest targets.

List of players
.

Most expensive transfers
.

Notes

References

External links

Official websites
PSG.FR - Site officiel du Paris Saint-Germain
Site officiel de OM - OM

French football derbies
Paris Saint-Germain F.C.
Olympique de Marseille
Football in Paris
Football in Provence-Alpes-Côte d'Azur
1971 establishments in France
Recurring sporting events established in 1971
Nicknamed sporting events